This is the discography for Jamaican reggae band Inner Circle.

Studio albums

1970s-1980s

1990s-present

Regional studio albums

Live albums

Compilation albums

Singles

1970s-1980s

1990s–present

References

External Links
 

Discographies of Jamaican artists
Reggae discographies